HMS Perseus was a  protected cruiser of the Royal Navy. There were eleven "Third class" protected cruisers in the class, which was designed by Sir William White. They mainly served at overseas stations rather than with the main fleets.

Design
HMS Perseus displaced 2,135 tons, had a crew complement of 224 men and were armed with eight QF 4 inch (102 mm) guns, eight 3 pounder guns, three machine guns, and two 18 inch (457 mm) torpedo tubes.

History
HMS Perseus was laid down at Earle's Shipbuilding, Hull, in May 1896, launched on 15 July 1897, and completed in 1901. 
Under the command of Commander Edmund Radcliffe Pears, she was in March 1901 commissioned to form part of the East Indies fleet, where she was often stationed in the Persian Gulf or the Gulf of Aden. In September 1901 she prevented the landing of Turkish troops at Kuwait, and in September 1902 she demolished the fort at Balhaf in response to pirate activities by the locals there.

HMS Perseus was sold for scrap on 26 May 1914.

Notes

References
 Brassey, T.A. The Naval Annual 1902. Portsmouth, UK: J Griffin and Co, 1902.
 Chesneau, Roger and Eugene M. Kolesnik. Conway's All The World's Fighting Ships 1860–1905. London: Conway Maritime Press, 1979. .
 Gardiner, Robert and Randal Gray. Conway's All The World's Fighting Ships 1906–1921. London: Conway Maritime Press, 1985. .
 World War I Naval Combat webpage

 

Pelorus-class cruisers of the Royal Navy
Ships built on the Humber
1897 ships